Interleukin 6 receptor (IL6R) also known as CD126 (Cluster of Differentiation 126) is a type I cytokine receptor.

Function 

Interleukin 6 (IL6) is a potent pleiotropic cytokine that regulates cell growth and differentiation and plays an important role in immune response. Dysregulated production of IL6 and this receptor are implicated in the pathogenesis of many diseases, such as multiple myeloma, autoimmune diseases and prostate cancer.

In melanocytes IL6R gene expression may be regulated by MITF.

Structure 

The IL6 receptor is a protein complex consisting of an IL-6 receptor subunit (IL6R) and interleukin 6 signal transducer Glycoprotein 130. IL6R also denotes the human gene encoding this subunit. Alternatively spliced transcript variants encoding distinct isoforms have been reported. IL6R subunit is also shared by many other cytokines.

Interactions 

Interleukin-6 receptor has been shown to interact with Interleukin 6 and ciliary neurotrophic factor.

See also 
 Cluster of differentiation
 Anti-IL-6
 Tocilizumab, a monoclonal antibody against IL6R
 Sarilumab, a monoclonal antibody against IL6R

References

Further reading

External links 
 

Type I cytokine receptors
Clusters of differentiation